Hirslanden is a quarter in the district 7 in Zürich.

It was formerly a municipality of its own, having been incorporated into Zürich in 1893.

Hirslanden is located on the western side of the Adlisberg.

District 7 of Zürich
Former municipalities of the canton of Zürich